Saray Ione Serrano (born 26 April 1979) is a Spanish former synchronized swimmer who competed in the 2004 Summer Olympics.

References

1979 births
Living people
Spanish synchronized swimmers
Olympic synchronized swimmers of Spain
Synchronized swimmers at the 2004 Summer Olympics